Andrea Bussaglia (born 25 May 1997) is an Italian football player who plays for Monopoli.

Club career
He spent the first three seasons of his senior career in the fourth-tier Serie D.

On 14 July 2017, he signed with Serie C club Santarcangelo. He made his Serie C debut for Santarangelo on 27 August 2017 in a game against Pordenone.

For the next 2018–19 season, he moved up to the second tier, signing with Serie B club Cittadella on 5 July 2018.

On 3 November 2020, he joined Livorno.

On 20 July 2021, he went to Monopoli.

References

External links
 

1997 births
People from Fano
Sportspeople from the Province of Pesaro and Urbino
Living people
Italian footballers
Association football midfielders
Rimini F.C. 1912 players
Alma Juventus Fano 1906 players
Forlì F.C. players
Santarcangelo Calcio players
A.S. Cittadella players
U.S. Livorno 1915 players
S.S. Monopoli 1966 players
Serie B players
Serie C players
Serie D players